is a junction passenger railway station located in the city of Kawasaki, Kanagawa, Japan, operated by the private railway operator Keikyu Corporation. The station is one of two main rail transportation hubs in central Kawasaki (the other being JR East's Kawasaki Station, which is a short walking distance away).

Lines

Station layout
Keikyū Kawasaki Station has two elevated island platforms serving four tracks for the Keikyū Main Line, connected to the three ground-level bay platforms serving the Keikyu Daishi Line and station building by an underpass.

Platforms

History
It was renamed  on November 1, 1925 to avoid confusion with the nearby JGR Kawasaki Station. The tracks were elevated in May 1966. The station was renamed Keikyū Kawasaki on 1 June 1987.

Keikyū introduced station numbering to its stations on 21 October 2010; Keikyū Kawasaki Station was assigned station number KK20.

Passenger statistics
In fiscal 2019, the station was used by an average of 132,524 passengers daily. 

The passenger figures for previous years are as shown below.

Surrounding area
The station is also surrounded by many shopping complexes, restaurants, and a Toho movie theater. JR Kawasaki Station is located to the southwest of the station.

See also
 List of railway stations in Japan

References

External links

Keikyū Kawasaki Station information 

Railway stations in Japan opened in 1902
Keikyū Main Line
Keikyū Daishi Line
Stations of Keikyu
Railway stations in Kawasaki, Kanagawa